Patrick Mölleken (born 27 September 1993 in Haan) is a German actor, film producer, dubber and voice-over artist on radio dramas as well as on audiobooks.

Biography 
Patrick Mölleken made first experiences on stage already at the age of five at piano concerts and gala events. At the age of ten he got his first roles in TV-movies such as Alarm für Cobra 11 and Carwash. Almost simultaneously, he began his work as a voice-over artist on a radio commercial for Legoland Deutschland.

Following from this, he appeared in several further television productions accompanied by works at the recording studio. From 2006 to 2010 Mölleken attended the acting school Juniorhouse in Cologne. 2007 producer Wolfgang Rademann took Patrick Mölleken to the German Das Traumschiff and talk-host Harald Schmidt invited him as guest to his Die Harald Schmidt Show. As a dubber he participated together with Mario Adorf in the very same year in the 26-episode animated series Kleiner Dodo by lending his voice to the ape Pong.

His biggest TV-part up to that point was his role in the 2008 crime movie Pfarrer Braun – Heiliger Birnbaum, aside to Ottfried Fischer. After that Mölleken played opposite Ludwig Trepte in the TV-drama Ihr könnt euch niemals sicher sein, which was awarded among others with the Austrian television award Romy and the Grimme-Preis in 2009.

In 2010 Patrick Mölleken received the Deutschen Hörbuchpreis for Wie man unsterblich wird – Jede Minute zählt (Ways to Live Forever). His work for audio books and radio dramas has since been rewarded frequently with various nominations. They follow numerous film and television casts in a variety of formats, including Extinction – The G.M.O. Chronicles, the winter-special Der Bergdoktor – Durch eisige Höhen, Quirk of Fate, Mord in bester Familie and Isenhart: The Hunt Is on for Your Soul. In 2010 he played the leading role of Tom in the mystery and first 3D-series Grimmsberg.

Under the direction of Walter Adler he was part of the cast of the SWR2 audio book of Isabel Allende's famous Das Geisterhaus in 2010, which was honored with the Deutschen Hörbuchpreis 2011 in the category "Best Fiction".

2010 he was elected by the German youth magazine Bravo in their campaign Mission Famous as "Sinalco-Boy" and became part of the jury.

Since 2011 Mölleken has been more often seen in war productions, like in Jewish Alley, which was reviewed by Steven Spielberg, in Rommel as the Desert Fox (Ulrich Tukur)’s son, in Zersplitterte Nacht, as well as in A Good Story under the guidance of cinematographer Christopher Doyle.

Subsequent to his graduation from high school by doing his Abitur (Higher School Certificate) Patrick Mölleken embodied the role of the deathly cold spree killer KILIAN. in the 2012 same-titled movie.

In the second season of the RTL series Der Lehrer Mölleken can be seen in the role of student Moritz Schenker. In 2014 sitcom Die Kuhflüsterin Patrick Mölleken played the role of Thommy, the rebellious son of veterinary practitioner Belinda Mommsen. In 2016 he embodied the antagonist Wittich in the period film King Laurin. In Tatort: Hundstage by Stephan Wagner Patrick Mölleken played the role of Jonas Stiehler. In 2016, Wolfgang Rademann cast Mölleken in his last production Das Traumschiff: Cuba.

Since 2017 Mölleken can be seen in the ZDF series Frühling in the role of Peet Hagen, who suffers from paraplegia due a swimming accident in Frühling – Schritt ins Licht.

By publishing the music video Aber in summer of 2018, Patrick Mölleken took a stand against racism alongside Eko Fresh and Yunus Cumartpay.

On January 30, 2019, the anniversary of Adolf Hitler's seizure of power, the period movie  was launched, in which Patrick Mölleken plays the role of Jewish National Socialist Michael Glickstein.

Filmography 

2004: Alarm für Cobra 11 – Die Autobahnpolizei (TV Series)
2005: Fragile
2005: Carwash
2006: Dragon Tiger Gate - Child (voice, uncredited)
2006: Robin Pilcher – Jenseits des Ozeans (TV Movie) - Charles Inchelvie
2007: Evelyn (Short)
2007-2017: Das Traumschiff (TV Series) - Maik Jahnke / Daniel Busch
2008: Maddin in Love (TV Series) - Pascal
2008: Familie Sonnenfeld (TV Series) - Bastian
2008: Pfarrer Braun (TV Series) - Lukas Lehmkuhl
2008: Ihr könnt euch niemals sicher sein (TV Movie) - Sven
2008: Alles was zählt (TV Series) - Tommy
2008: Die stählerne Zeit (TV Series documentary) - Hermann Enters
2008: Marie und die tödliche Gier (TV Movie) - Heiner (uncredited)
2009: Die Alpenklinik – Riskante Entscheidung (TV Movie) - Noah Baumgarten
2009: Kambakkht Ishq - Gangster 5 (voice)
2010: Der Bergdoktor (TV Series) - Lars Wiesdorf
2010: Rennschwein Rudi Rüssel (TV Series) - Dominik
2010-2013: Alle Jahre wieder (TV Series) - Stefan Sommer
2010-2018: In aller Freundschaft (TV Series) - Lennart Schönlein / Jan Matthies
2011: Quirk of Fate– Eine Laune des Schicksals - Toby
2011: Mord in bester Familie (TV Movie) - Daniel Lorenz
2011: Aktenzeichen XY... ungelöst (TV Series) - Sven
2011: Grimmsberg (Short) - Tom
2011: Isenhart: The Hunt Is on for Your Soul (TV Movie) - Isenhart - jung
2011: Extinction – The G.M.O. Chronicles - Tom - Age 17
2011: Zivilcourage (Short) - Justin
2011: Schmidt & Schmitt – Wir ermitteln in jedem Fall – Crash ins Koma
2012: Achtste Groepers Huilen Niet - Joep (voice)
2012: Die Rosenheim-Cops (TV Series) - Severin Gschwendtner
2012: I Declare War - Skinner (German version, voice)
2012: Jewish Alley (Short) - Orthodoxer Jude
2012: Rommel (TV Movie) - Manfred Rommel
2012: Heiter bis tödlich: Fuchs und Gans (TV Series) - Max
2012: Knallerfrauen (TV Series) - Fahrer
2012: Tom’s Video - Tom Litznik
2012-2015: Stuttgart Homicide (TV Series) - Kevin Scheuerle / Manuel Hüller
2013: A Good Story (Short) - Soldier Adam
2013: Wir - Kilian
2013: Sturm der Liebe (TV Series) - Hansi Dietl
2013-2014: Der Lehrer (TV Series) - Moritz Schenker
2014: Lebe lieber italienisch! (TV Movie) - Florian
2014: 16 über Nacht! (TV Movie) - Simon
2014: El 5 de talleres - Polaco (voice)
2014: Danni Lowinski (TV Series) - Pfleger
2014: Der Koch - Ulagu (voice)
2014: Weihnachten für Einsteiger (TV Movie) - Kalle
2014: Heiter bis tödlich: Morden im Norden (TV Series) - Robert Björnsen
2014: Totes Land (Short) - Jan
2014: Keep Your Head Up (music video)
2014-2019: Rosamunde Pilcher (TV Series) - Robin Dawson / Rod Marshland
2015: Allein unter Irren (Short) - Konsti
2015: Heldt (TV Series) - Timo Gerlach
2015: Cologne P.D. (TV Series) - Pascal Burkhard
2015:  (TV Series) - Daniel Ruland
2015: Gespensterjäger – Auf eisiger Spur - Harry
2015: Die Kuhflüsterin (TV Series) - Thommy Mommsen
2016: Tatort (Episode: "") - Jonas Stiehler
2016: König Laurin - Wittich
2016-2017: Eltern allein zu Haus (TV Mini-Series) - Jan Schröder
2017: Der Staatsanwalt (TV Series) - Max Töpfer
2017: WaPo Bodensee (TV Series) - Lukas Kerner
2017: The Old Fox (TV Series) - Max Lehmann
2017: Ein Kind wird gesucht (TV Movie) - Dani
2017-2018: Frühling (TV Series) - Peet Hagen
2018: Dahoam is Dahoam (TV Series) - Lukas Kneidinger
2018: Notruf Hafenkante (TV Series) - Victor Bossmann
2018: Mein rechter, rechter Platz ist frei … - Tim
2018: Einstein (TV Series) - Eric
2018: Das letzte Mahl - Michael Glickstein
2018: Lifelines (TV Series) - Fabian Weiler
2018: Rentnercops (TV Series) - Ben Schmidt
2018: SOKO München (TV Series) - Flori
2018: Die Bergretter (TV Series) - Roman Stadlhuber
2019: Nord bei Nordwest – Gold! (TV Series) - Christoph Müller
2019: Hubert ohne Staller (TV Series) - Leon Schwarz
2019: Und tot bist Du! – Ein Schwarzwaldkrimi (two-parter) (TV Movie) - Josef Natterer (1945)
2021: Silent Hell 9
 Will Cameron

Audiography

Film 
2006: Fragile
2007: Kleiner Dodo
2007: Dragon Tiger Gate
2007: Rubljowka – Straße zur Glückseligkeit
2007: Spurlos
2009: Bleach
2010: Time to Kill (Nicolas Cage)
2010: Summer Wars
2010: Themba
2010: Die Rückkehr der Wollmäuse
2010: Bleach: Memories of Nobody
2010: Home for Christmas
2012: Beneath the Darkness
2012: Blue Exorcist
2013: Pororo - The Racing Adventure
2014: I Declare War
2014: Starke Mädchen weinen nicht
2012: Blue Exorcist - The Movie
2014: Samurai Flamenco
2014: Der Koch
2015: Emma, einfach magisch! (season 2)
2015: Aku no Hana – Die Blumen des Bösen
2015: Der Spieler mit der Nummer 5
2015: Photo Kano
2016: Food Wars! Shokugeki no Soma

Audio books and radio dramas 
2007: Angelika Bartram: Die Abenteuermaschine. (WDR).
2008: Silke Lambeck: Herr Röslein. Der Audio Verlag, Berlin 2008, .
2008: Brudermord (WDR).
2008: Ulli Potofski and others: Locke greift an. Random House Audio, Köln 2008, .
2008: Das Fazzoletti-Chaos. (WDR).
2008: Auf der Jagd nach dem Schwarzen Gold. (WDR).
2008: Joachim Hecker: Das Haus der kleinen Forscher. Der Audio Verlag, Berlin 2008, .
2008: FC Schalke 04: Knappenkids 2 – Mannschaft in Gefahr.
2009: Silke Lambeck: Herr Röslein kommt zurück. Der Audio Verlag, Berlin 2009, .
2009: Sally Nicholls: Wie man unsterblich wird – Jede Minute zählt. Igel Records, 2009, .
2009: Ken Follett: Die Tore der Welt. Lübbe, Bergisch Gladbach 2009, .
2009: Georg Wieghaus: Die Nacht von San Juan. (WDR).
2009: Rudolf Herfurtner: Verschwunden im Werwolfwald. (WDR).
2009: Alemannia Aachen: Die Aleminis und die verschwundene Stadionuhr.
2010: Die große Fußball-Box: 8-9-10 – Der Fußballgeheimbund rettet die Nationalelf. Random House Audio, Köln 2010, .
2010: Team Undercover. Folge 5: Der geraubte Stern. Contendo Media, Krefeld 2010.
2010: Isabel Allende: Das Geisterhaus. Der Hörverlag, München 2010, .
2010: Nelson und Mandela – Das Länderspiel. (WDR).
2011: Karl Olsberg: Rafael 2.0. Lübbe Audio, Köln 2011, .
2011: Tom Angleberger: Yoda ich bin! Alles ich weiß! Lübbe Audio, Köln 2011, 
2011: Tessa Gratton: Blood Magic – Weiß wie Mondlicht, rot wie Blut. Random House Audio, Köln 2011, .
2011: Tessa Gratton: Blood Magic – Weiß wie Mondlicht, rot wie Blut. Random House Audio, Köln 2011, .
2011: Sabine Zett: Hugos geniale Welt. Jumbo, Hamburg 2011, .
2011: Tom Angleberger: Darth Paper schlägt zurück. Lübbe Audio, Köln 2011, .
2012: Sabine Zett: Hugos Masterplan. Jumbo, Hamburg 2012, .
2012: Sabine Zett: Hugo hebt ab! Jumbo, Hamburg 2012, .
2012: Anne Lepper: Hund wohin gehen wir. (WDR)
2012: Julianna Baggott: Memento – Die Überlebenden. Lübbe Audio, Köln, 2012, .
2012: Bram Stoker: Dracula. Jumbo, Hamburg 2012, .
2012: Sabine Zett: Very important Hugo. Jumbo, Hamburg 2012, .
2012: Thorsten Nesch: School Shooter. (WDR).
2012: Rommel. Universum Film, München 2012.
2012: Sigurd, der ritterliche Held. Folge 2: Im Tal der Nebel. Romantruhe, 2012.
2012: Tom Angleberger: Star Wars Wookiee – Zwischen Himmel und Hölle: Chewbacca. Lübbe Audio, Köln 2012, .
2012: Dark Mysteries. Folge 5: Narbenherz. WinterZeit, Remscheid 2012, .
2013: The Return of Captain Future. Folge 5: Mond der Unvergessenen. Highscore Music, München 2013, .
2013: Mord in Serie. Folge 7: Das Netzwerk. Contendo Media, Krefeld 2013.
2013: Heiko Wolz: Allein unter Superhelden. Der Audio Verlag, Berlin 2013, .
2013: Team Undercover. Folge 6: Der unheimliche Clown. Contendo Media, Krefeld 2013.
2013: Team Undercover. Folge 7: Doppeltes Spiel. Contendo Media, Krefeld 2013.
2013: Ulli Potofski: Lockes Matchplan – Fußballprofi. BVK, Kempen 2013.
2013: Sabine Zett: Hugo chillt. Jumbo, Hamburg 2013, .
2013: Team Undercover. Folge 8: Jagd in die Vergangenheit. Contendo Media, Krefeld 2013.
2013: Die schöne Magelone. Romanzen op. 33. Kohfeldt, Edewecht 2013, .
2013: Heroin. (WDR).
2013: Heiko Wolz: Die Rache der Superhelden. Der Audio Verlag, Berlin 2013, .
2013: Team Undercover. Folge 9: Tödliche Bedrohung. Contendo Media, Krefeld 2013.
2013: Mord in Serie. Folge 10: Atemlos. Contendo Media, Krefeld 2013.
2013: Sabine Zett: Cool bleiben, Hugo!. Jumbo, Hamburg 2013, .
2013: Team Undercover. Folge 10: Angst um Odysseus. Contendo Media, Krefeld 2013.
2014: Team Undercover. Folge 11: Gefahr aus dem Weltall. Contendo Media, Krefeld 2014.
2014: Robert Muchamore: Top Secret – Die Rivalen: Die neue Generation 3. Der Hörverlag, München 2014, .
2014: Dagmar H. Mueller: Die Chaosschwestern voll im Einsatz! Band 4. Der Hörverlag, München 2014, .
2014: Klaus Barbie – Begegnung mit dem Bösen. (WDR).
2014: Team Undercover. Folge 12: Geisterspuk im Landschulheim. Contendo Media, Krefeld 2014.
2014: Pierdomenico Baccalario: Der Zauberladen von Applecross: Das geheime Erbe. Band 1. Random House Audio, München 2014, .
2014: Michela Murgia: Accabadora. (WDR).
2014: Robert Muchamore: Rock War – Unter Strom. Band 1. Der Hörverlag, München 2014, .
2014: Team Undercover. Folge 13: Im flammenden Inferno. Contendo Media, Krefeld 2014.
2015: Joseph Delaney: Seventh Son – Der Schüler des Geisterjägers. cbj audio, München 2015, 978-3-8371-3055-3.
2015: Team Undercover. Folge 14: Unter Haien. Contendo Media, Krefeld 2015.
2015: Potz Blitz – Die Zauberakademie. Folge 1: Ein zauberhafter Anfang. Contendo Media, Krefeld 2015.
2015: Hans Pleschinski: Königsallee. Der Audio Verlag, Berlin 2015, .
2015: Cornelia Funke: Tintentod. Oetinger Media, Hamburg 2015, .
2015: Team Undercover. Folge 15: Im Fadenkreuz. Contendo Media, Krefeld 2015.
2015: Jennifer Niven: All die verdammt perfekten Tage. Random House Audio, München 2015, .
2016: Die Sneakers und das Torgeheimnis. Band 1. Random House Audio, München 2016, .
2016: Die Sneakers und der Supersprinter. Band 2. Random House Audio, München 2016, .
2016: Joe Hill, Gabriel Rodriguez: Locke & Key. Die komplette Serie. Audible Studios, Berlin 2016.
2016: John Boyne: Die unglaublichen Abenteuer des Barnaby Brocket. (WDR).
2016: Pollution Police. Folge 14: Die Zirkus-Falle. Pollution Police Media, Goch 2016.
2016: Joseph Conrad: Der Geheimagent. (WDR).
2016: Mord in Serie. Folge 24: Labyrinth. Contendo Media, Krefeld 2016.
2016: Lars Niedereichholz: Mofaheld. Audible Studios, Berlin 2016.
2016: Bochum-Detektive: Fall 1 – Schwarzes Gold. Pit & Land, Lüdinghausen 2016.
2016: Veit König: Surehand. Nach Motiven von Karl May. (WDR).
2017: Miss Melody – Verrückt vor Glück. Spotting Image, Köln 2016.
2017: Davide Morosinotto: Die Mississippi-Bande. Wie wir mit drei Dollar reich wurden. Random House Audio, München 2017, .
2017: Eugen Egner: Aldartenrahl. (WDR).
2017: Stuart Kummer: Pornflakes. (WDR).
2017: Hannah Siebern: Barfuß auf Wolken. Audible Studios, Berlin 2017.
2017: Barfuß am Klavier – Die Story von AnnenMayKantereit. (WDR).
2017: Dorian Hunter: Folge 35.2 Niemandsland – Ausgeliefert. Zaubermond-Audio, Hamburg 2017.
2017: John Sinclair: Sonderedition 07 Brandmal. Lübbe Audio, Köln 2017, .
2017: John Sinclair: Sonderedition 10 Das andere Ufer der Nacht. Lübbe Audio, Köln 2017, .

2017: William Faulkner: Licht im August. (SWR).
2017: John Sinclair Classics: Folge 32: Das Todeskabinett. Lübbe Audio, Köln 2017, .
2018: Die drei ???: Folge 191: Verbrechen im Nichts. Europa (Sony Music), München 2018.
2018: John Sinclair Classics: Folge 33: Irrfahrt ins Jenseits. Lübbe Audio, Köln 2018, .
2018: Luther Blissett: Q. (WDR).
2018: Caiman Club. Folge 1: Vel predator. Vel praedam. (WDR).
2018: David Zane Mairowitz: Marlov und der Moskauer Bombenzirkus. (WDR).
2019: Robert Woelfl: Überfluss Wüste. (WDR).

Video games 
2011: Harry Potter and the Deathly Hallows - Part 2 as Seamus Finnigan
2012: Dark Parables 3: Der Schmerz der Schneekönigin.
2013: Fabled Legends: Die Rückkehr des Rattenfängers.
2013: The Keepers: Das Geheimnis des Wächterordens.
2013: Edgar Allan Poe: Dark Tales: Der Goldene Käfer.
2014: Aion 4.5 - Steel Cavalry
2014: Invizimals: Der Widerstand
2014: Call of Duty: Advanced Warfare
2015: Call of Duty: Advanced Warfare – Havoc DLC
2015: Battlefield Hardline
2015: Call of Duty: Advanced Warfare – Ascendance DLC
2015: Call of Duty: Advanced Warfare – Supremacy DLC
2015: Call of Duty: Advanced Warfare – Reckoning DLC
2015: Until Dawn as Mike
2015: Star Wars Battlefront
2015: Tom Clancy’s Rainbow Six Siege
2016: ReCore
2016: Aion 5.1 – Der Weise des Turms
2016: Battlefield 1
2016: Titanfall 2
2016: Call of Duty: Infinite Warfare
2016: Watch Dogs 2
2017: Horizon Zero Dawn
2017: Tom Clancy’s Ghost Recon Wildlands
2017: Aion 5.3 – Dragon Lord's Resurrection
2017: Battlefield 1 – They Shall Not Pass DLC
2017: Aion 5.4
2017: Master X Master
2017: Battlefield 1 – In The Name Of The Tsar DLC
2017: Star Wars: Battlefront II
2017: Ostwind – Das Spiel
2017: SpellForce 3

Awards 
 2010: Deutscher Hörbuchpreis in category "Bestes Kinderhörbuch" (best audio-book for youth) Wie man unsterblich wird for Angeli Backhausen (direction), Kai Hogenacker (voice) und Patrick Mölleken (voice)

References

External links 
 Official Website of Patrick Mölleken
 Literature from and about Patrick Mölleken in the catalogue of the Deutschen Nationalbibliothek

1993 births
Living people
People from Haan
German male film actors
German male television actors
German male voice actors